Bohumil Gregor (Prague, 14 July 1926 – 4 November 2005) was a Czech conductor.

Gregor studied double bass at the Prague Conservatory. He made his conducting debut on October 26, 1947, at the Divadlo 5. května (Theatre of the Fifth of May, now the Prague State Opera). He conducted at the State Theatre in Brno (1949–1951), the National Theatre in Prague (1955–1958 and 1962–1966), the State Theatre in Ostrava (1958–1962), the Royal Swedish Opera in Stockholm (1966–1969), the State Opera in Hamburg (1969–1972), De Nederlandse Opera in Amsterdam (from 1972), and also in San Francisco, Philadelphia and Washington. In 1999, he returned to the Prague State Opera where he worked as musical director until 2002.

Gregor died in the city of his birth, where he had conducted his last performances of The Cunning Little Vixen.

Selected discography 
 Gioacchino Rossini: William Tell; Supraphon (1964)
 Leoš Janáček: From the House of the Dead; Supraphon Music  (1964)
 Leoš Janáček: The Makropulos Affair; Supraphon (1966)
 Leoš Janáček: Jenůfa; Supraphon (1969), later reissued by EMI
 Leoš Janáček: Příhody lišky Bystroušky (Tales of Vixen Sharp-Ears); Supraphon (1972)
 Antonín Dvořák: 3 Slavonic Rhapsodies, My Home, Symphonic Variations, A Hero's Song, Scherzo capriccioso; Czech Philharmonic, Supraphon 11 0378-2 (1989)
 George Frideric Handel: Water Music; Supraphon (1993)
 Antonín Dvořák: The Devil and Kate (2003)
 Leoš Janáček: The Cunning Little Vixen; Prague National Theatre Chorus and Orchestra, Supraphon SU 3071-2612 (2003)
 Zemlinsky: Lyrische Symphonie (with Karan Armstrong, Ivan Kusnjer, Czech Philharmonic Orchestra), Supraphon, recorded 1987-88
 Dittersdorf: 6 Sinfonies Exprimant - Les Metamorphoses D'Ovide, Prague Chamber Orchestra, recorded 1986-87

References

External links 
 Bohumil Gregor biography at Státní Opera Praha
 Bohumil Gregor at the Czech Music Dictionary of People and Institutions 

1926 births
2005 deaths
Czech conductors (music)
Male conductors (music)
Czech classical double-bassists
Male double-bassists
Musicians from Prague
Prague Conservatory alumni
20th-century conductors (music)
20th-century double-bassists
20th-century Czech male musicians